Northern Pacific 3617 is a restored SD45 diesel locomotive originally owned by the Northern Pacific. It was built in 1967 to replace older locomotives that were "trade-ins" for new units in the 1960s. Since 2007, NP 3617 has resided at the Lake Superior Railroad Museum, and was restored to operational condition in March 2021.

History
In the mid-1960s Northern Pacific started to replace its first-generation diesel locomotives. Northern Pacific's first second-generation diesel locomotive purchases came from General Electric. But General Motors' Electro-Motive Division was determined to regain a lost customer and persuaded NP to buy four SD45 locomotives, contingent on the performance of the EMD's demonstrators. After the loan of a pair of demonstrators, EMD secured an additional order for sixteen locomotives, and later ten more. A fourth order for 20 was still outstanding when the NP merged into Burlington Northern in March 1970.

NP 3617 was a part of the second order of SD45s purchased by Northern Pacific. NP 3617 was built in April 1967 and was delivered like all of NP's SD45s in their black and gold freight paint scheme. At , the SD45s were the largest on Northern Pacific's diesel locomotive fleet and were allocated to the transcontinental freight locomotive pool. NP 3617 operated on the Northern Pacific for only 3 years until the Burlington Northern merger. The 3617 received a new number, 6417, and was eventually repainted in BN's cascade green scheme. The 6417 then operated on the Burlington Northern until its retirement in March 1987.

Wisconsin Central Ltd. began operation in October 1987, and the 6417 was one of the ex-BN SD45s that the railroad utilized at the start of its operations. The locomotive would be renumbered twice more, to 6485 and later 7495. Canadian National acquired the Wisconsin Central in 2001. The 7495 continued as a WC unit until 2007, when it was donated to the Lake Superior Railroad Museum in Duluth, MN.

Current Operations

From 2007 until 2015, extensive restoration was completed to restore the locomotive to its original Northern Pacific appearance. It was at one point sent to North Dakota to be repainted. After being repainted the gyrating-warning light on its nose was restored. In March 2021, the 3617 was fired up for the first time, also running under its own power. In 2022, it was displayed at Saint Paul Union Depot for "Train Days". After display in St. Paul, it is planned to operate on North Shore Scenic Railroad.

References

External links 
 Lake Superior Railroad Museum Where NP 3617 is on display.
 North Shore Scenic Railroad Where NP 3617 operates.

Individual locomotives of the United States
Northern Pacific Railway locomotives
Preserved diesel locomotives
Electro-Motive Division locomotives
Standard gauge locomotives of the United States
Railway locomotives introduced in 1967